The Billown Circuit is a motorcycle road-race course used for the Southern 100, the Pre-TT Classic races and the National Road Races meetings near Castletown on the Isle of Man. Racing is held on public roads closed for racing by an Act of Tynwald, the parliament of the Isle of Man.

The course is 4.25 miles (6.8 km) long and is in the parishes of Arbory and Malew. The course start-line is on the outskirts of Castletown and the course includes parts of the primary A5 New Castletown Road, the A28 Castletown to Ballabeg road, the A7 Ballasalla to Port Erin road and the A3 Castletown to Ramsey road.

History
Following the closure of the former RAF Station at Andreas to motorcycle racing in 1954, and to celebrate the success of George 'Sparrow' Costain and Derek Ennett at the 1954 Manx Grand Prix, the Southern Motor Cycle Club (SMCC) proposed that a motorcycle circuit be developed in the area around Castletown in the Isle of Man.

The proposal for a "South TT" using roads around the new Castletown A5 by-pass and the Billown Mansion met with a lukewarm response, and an application for a grant of £500 for race expenditure was rejected by the Tynwald Race Committee in April 1955. A grant of £500 from local businesses, including T. H. Coleburn for a public address system, enabled the first Southern 100 road race event to be scheduled for July 1955 as a club-level race meeting.  

The Billown Circuit became a regional registered circuit in 1956 and a National Racing circuit in 1957, with a maximum of 45 entries per class. In 1988 a new race meeting was introduced with the Pre-TT Classic races, followed by the National Road Races in 1990. The re-introduction of two-stroke racing at the 2008 Isle of Man TT, with a Lightweight TT and Ultra-Lightweight TT race, used the Billown Circuit to host Isle of Man TT races as part of the 2008 National Road Race meeting.

Speed and race records
The lap record for the Billown Circuit is 2 minutes 12.735 seconds at an average speed of  set by Michael Dunlop during the 2017 races.

List of fatal accidents involving competitors

List of riders by overall numbers of races won

See also
Isle of Man TT Races
Manx Grand Prix
Clypse Course
St. John's Short Course

References

External links

Motorsport venues in the Isle of Man